Brunner Glacier is a narrow steep-walled glacier  long, descending the west slope of the Cumulus Hills between Landry Bluff and Halfmoon Bluff to enter Shackleton Glacier. It was named by the Texas Tech Shackleton Glacier Expedition (1964–65) for Staff Sergeant Donald R. Brunner, a member of the U.S. Army Aviation Detachment which supported the expedition.

References 

Glaciers of Dufek Coast